Siakago is a town in Embu County, Kenya. It was previously the capital of the former Mbeere District of Eastern Province. It hosted Mbeere county council and was also headquarters of Siakago division of Mbeere District. In 1999, Siakago division had a population of 34,330, of whom 2,312 were classified urban (1999 census.) Siakago is located 25 kilometres east of Embu town. The Kiangombe mountain lies just east of Siakago.

On November 6, 2010 Peter Karanja, a jealous Administration Police officer, killed 10 people in a shooting spree.

The Member of Parliament for Siakago Constituency (now Mbeere North) is the Hon. Muriuki Charles Njagagua, MP, while the Siakago Constituency Development Fund Account Manager is Mr. Richard Maingi.

References 

Embu County
Populated places in Eastern Province (Kenya)